John Diffley may refer to:

 John Diffley (soccer) (born 1967), American soccer player and athletic director
 John Diffley (biologist) (born 1958), molecular biologist